Jucunda may refer to :

948 Jucunda, a minor planet orbiting the Sun
Bellamya jucunda, a species of gastropod in the family Viviparidae
Evarcha jucunda, a species of jumping spider
Ixora jucunda, a species of plant in the family Rubiaceae
Odice jucunda, a moth of the family Noctuida
Palpopleura jucunda, a species of dragonfly in family Libellulidae